This article lists non-Japanese people who were ninja, or similar covert agents influenced by ninja.

Strictly, there were very few foreigners recognized as ninja except for legendary figures. However, some other foreign soldiers and agents engaged in infiltration and espionage with Japanese forces.

Foreign-born ninja in Japan

Foreign-born kanja 

"Kanja"(間者) is the Japanese word for spy. Ninja could act as kanja though their activities were not limited to espionage and ninja sometimes used kanja as their subordinate. 

This list includes foreign-born Japanese spies who were not recorded as ninja at that time.

Legendary foreign ancestors of ninja 

According to Bansenshūkai, ninjustu was invented by ancient Chinese hero Fuxi and developed by Yellow Emperor though this account is considered fiction to give authority to ninja.

Also according to Bansenshūkai, The Art of War of Sun Tzu was oldest account of ninjutsu, the art of espionage.

Foreign agents who have been called "Ninja" but are unrelated to Japanese ninja 

See

See also 
 Ninja-Russia relations
 Ninja-Myanmar relations
 List of foreign-born samurai in Japan

References